Colin Wallace (born 2 October 1953 in Auckland) is best known as a first-class cricketer playing three games for Auckland in the 1978–79 season. He was also a right-hand batsman who had a first-class average of 14.66 as well as a wicket-keeper.

See also
 List of Auckland representative cricketers

References
 Cricinfo Colin Wallace article

Auckland cricketers
1953 births
Living people
Wicket-keepers
Cricketers from Auckland
20th-century New Zealand people